Clementia of Zähringen (died 1175), was a daughter of Conrad I, Duke of Zähringen and his wife Clementia of Namur. By her first marriage, Clementia was Duchess of Bavaria and Saxony. By her second marriage she was Countess of Savoy.

Duchess of Saxony and Bavaria
Clementia was the youngest of six children, her family owned territory in Swabia. She was a great-granddaughter of Conrad I, Count of Luxembourg and his wife Clementia of Aquitaine, herself daughter of William VII, Duke of Aquitaine.

Clementia was firstly married in 1147 to Henry the Lion, Duke of Saxony, he later inherited Bavaria. The marriage was arranged to confirm her father's alliance with the Welf party in Southern Germany. She was heiress of Badenweiler, although her husband sold these Swabian estates to Frederick I, Holy Roman Emperor in 1158, receiving in exchange Herzberg, Scharzfels and Pöhlde south of the Harz.

Clementia and Henry had three children:
Henry, died young
Gertrude (1155–1197), married first Frederick IV, Duke of Swabia, and then King Canute VI of Denmark
Richenza (c. 1157 – 1167), died young

Henry repudiated Clementia because of the growing difficulties between her brother Duke Berthold IV and Emperor Frederick, the latter with whom Duke Henry was by then in close alliance with. Frederick did not cherish Guelphish possessions in his home area and offered Henry several fortresses in Saxony in exchange. The couple were officially divorced at Constance on 23 November 1162.

Countess of Savoy
Clementia remained unwed for two years before she married her second husband, Umberto III, Count of Savoy, she was his third wife. Umberto's first two marriages were not successful, his first wife died young; his second marriage ended in an annulment. Umberto gave up and became a Carthusian monk. However, the nobles and common people of Savoy begged him to marry yet again, which he reluctantly did to Clementia. 

Clementia and Humbert had two daughters:
 Sophia (1165–1202), married Azzo VI of Este
 Alicia (1166–1178), betrothed to John of England

Clementia died in 1175, predeceasing both her husbands and three of her four daughters. After her death, Umberto attempted to return to the monastic life yet again but was forced to remarry a fourth and final time to Beatrice of Viennois who bore him the long-awaited son and heir, Thomas.

Ancestry

Notes

References

 

|-

|-

12th-century births
1175 deaths
Year of birth unknown
House of Zähringen
Duchesses of Saxony
Duchesses of Bavaria
Countesses of Savoy
Burials at Hautecombe Abbey
12th-century German women 
12th-century German nobility
Remarried royal consorts